Echinisis is a genus of deep-sea bamboo coral in the family Isididae.

References

Isididae
Octocorallia genera